The grapevine is a dance figure in partner dancing that shares a common appearance, with some variation, in ballroom, club, and folk  dances. It includes side steps and steps across the support foot. The step is used, for example, in the foxtrot, polka, Electric Slide and hustle as well as in freestyle aerobics.  

Troy and Margaret West Kinney described it in 1914 as part of the One-Step.

Sequence
The most basic repeating sequence of steps may be;

 Side step, 
 Step behind the support foot, 
 Side step, 
 Step across support foot.

The sequence may start from any of the four steps and may break wherever it is convenient to move into another dance figure or in the opposite direction. The whole sequence is in the same direction. 

In some dances (e.g., Polka, Hustle, Electric Slide) it is an eight count figure, often split into two, mirroring each other and called "grapevine to the right" and "grapevine to the left".

 Step right
 Step left foot to the right, crossing in front of right foot
 Step right
 Tap left against right
 Step left
 Step right foot to the left, crossing in front of the left foot
 Step left
 Tap right against left

See also
Mayim Mayim, a popular Israeli folk dance that uses a grapevine-style step
Glossary of dance moves

References

External links

Social dance steps